Varmazan Somaq (also Romanized as Varmazān Somāq; also known as Somāq, Sumāq, and Varmazān) is a village in Poshtdarband Rural District, in the Central District of Kermanshah County, Kermanshah Province, Iran. At the 2006 census, its population was 680, in 167 families.

References 

Populated places in Kermanshah County